Edward John DeBartolo Sr. (May 17, 1909 – December 19, 1994) was an  American businessman. In 1971, his Ohio-based corporation was ranked as 47th among the nation's top 400 construction contractors. In 1983, DeBartolo was included on Forbes magazine's first Forbes 400 list of richest Americans.

Early years 
The second of six children, DeBartolo was born in Youngstown, Ohio, a center of steel production that was also a major destination for immigrants from Southern and Eastern Europe. DeBartolo's parents, Anthony Paonessa and Rose Villani, had emigrated to the United States from Italy. DeBartolo never knew his biological father, who died suddenly before his birth.

After Anthony Paonessa's death, Rose Villani Paonessa married Michael DeBartolo, and Edward took his stepfather's family name. Michael DeBartolo emigrated from Terlizzi, Apulia, Italy, with his family at age 17 and became a paving contractor and builder of warehouses and other structures.  While a teenager, Edward DeBartolo began working, translating paving contracts for his stepfather, who did not read or write English.

DeBartolo went on to earn a degree in civil engineering at the University of Notre Dame. Next came a decade of construction jobs with his stepfather. Capitalizing on his engineering skills, DeBartolo found himself serving in the Army Corps of Engineers during World War II. It was during the War, in 1944, that he married Marie Patricia Montani and incorporated his own company, The Edward J. DeBartolo Corporation.

Adult life and career 
After the war ended, DeBartolo served as president of Michael DeBartolo Construction and as founder and president of his newly formed company.  DeBartolo was able to take advantage of dramatic changes occurring across the United States after World War II. As more Americans moved into suburbs, there was a corresponding increase in demand for convenient access to shopping. His first retail development was the construction of Gray's Drug Store and Sears, Roebuck and Co. department store in the "Uptown" area of Youngstown. DeBartolo's company was one of the first companies in the United States to build shopping centers in suburban communities. These shopping centers were initially plazas built as long strips, but soon DeBartolo began developing enclosed shopping malls as well, with brother Frank DeBartolo acting as architect.

The Edward J. DeBartolo Corporation was the undisputed leader in the shopping mall industry from the birth of the industry until DeBartolo's death, at one point owning almost one-tenth of all mall space in the United States. DeBartolo also branched out into other types of urban development and construction, such as hotels, office parks, and condominiums. He established a work ethic of fifteen-hour days and seven-day weeks.  He once told his senior executives, "My wife has never seen me lie down while the sun was up." By 1990, DeBartolo was estimated to have more than $1.4 billion in personal wealth.

A powerful strategic thinker, DeBartolo began acquiring department store chains in the late 1980s. In 1986, he helped finance Robert Campeau's purchase of Allied Stores Corporation, a department store holding corporation that owned such iconic department store brands as Jordan Marsh and Maas Brothers, as well as specialty stores such as Bonwit Teller and Ann Taylor.  DeBartolo lent Campeau $150 million to bridge the financing gap for the acquisition.  Campeau repaid the money, and in 1986, DeBartolo assisted in financing Allied Stores Corporation's acquisition of Federated Department Stores, a department store holding company and the owner of, among other assets, Macy's and Bloomingdale's department stores.  DeBartolo provided nearly $500 million in financing. In 1990, Federated went bankrupt, defaulting on the repayment of the loans made by DeBartolo; it emerged from bankruptcy after the ouster of Campeau in 1992 as a new public company under the name "Macy's, Inc." During the course of the bankruptcy, DeBartolo's cash flow was severely impaired, due to Federated's nonpayment as well as the real estate recession of the time.  DeBartolo's Federated positions were all realigned when Federated emerged from bankruptcy.

In 1988, he partnered with Dillard's Department Stores to buy Higbee's of Cleveland, Ohio. In 1992, William Dillard, founder of Dillard's, bought DeBartolo's share, except for the property interest in Higbee's Public Square flagship store in Cleveland (sold to Tower City in 2001), and renamed it the Higbee chain. DeBartolo's idea of a retail real estate developer going forward with new projects easily and quickly, by virtue of anchor stores which he owned, would never become a reality.

As a result of several years' impaired cash flow, DeBartolo prepared to take his company public as a real estate investment trust or "REIT".  Most of DeBartolo's competitors were preparing to do the same, their operations suffering from a lack of capital in the private markets. In late 1993, the two largest shopping center companies at the time, DeBartolo and Simon were coming to the market simultaneously.  Their advisors informed them that the capital markets could not absorb that much equity; either one of them must back down or prices would suffer severely.  DeBartolo agreed to withdraw.  In April, 1994, most of the properties owned by The Edward J. DeBartolo Corporation were transferred to DeBartolo Realty Corporation, a public REIT, in its initial public offering.  The new company was chaired by Edward J. DeBartolo Jr.; DeBartolo Sr. was unwilling to deal personally with the constraints of running a public company.  In 1996, DeBartolo Realty Corporation was acquired by Simon Property Group, the public REIT formed by DeBartolo's longtime competitors, Melvin and Herbert Simon.

DeBartolo's contributions to the campus at the University of Notre Dame include DeBartolo Hall (the main classroom building) and DeBartolo Performing Arts Center (DPAC), both located on a quad that students refer to as "DeBartolo Quad". There is also a DeBartolo Hall on the campus of Youngstown State University (YSU), in his hometown of Youngstown, where DeBartolo has made many endowments to YSU. The DeBartolo Corporation continues to be based in nearby Boardman, Ohio.

Sporting interests 

DeBartolo purchased the San Francisco 49ers in 1977, giving the team to his son. DeBartolo Jr. devoted significant resources to the team, became an expert in team management and player relations, and made it the most successful NFL franchise in the 1980s.

DeBartolo founded the Pittsburgh Maulers of the United States Football League in March 1983, but folded the team after the first season (1984) when the league announced it would move to a fall schedule, the same time as the NFL's Pittsburgh Steelers.

The family also owned the Pittsburgh Penguins of the National Hockey League from February 1977 until selling it to an ownership group led by Howard Baldwin in November 1991. His team would win the Stanley Cup in 1991. He would be engraved onto the Stanley Cup along with his daughter Denise DeBartolo York. DeBartolo said at a rally after the first win that the occasion was "possibly the happiest moment of my life."
He owned the soccer team Pittsburgh Spirit from 1978 until 1986.

While DeBartolo was unsuccessful in his attempt to purchase the Chicago White Sox in 1980, he owned and developed three thoroughbred racetracks – Thistledown in North Randall, Ohio, Remington Park in Oklahoma City, and Louisiana Downs in Bossier City, Louisiana.

Death
DeBartolo died of pneumonia on December 19, 1994 in Youngstown, Ohio at the age of 85.

Honors 
In 1981, he received the Order of Merit from the Italian government.
In 1988, he was awarded the Presidential Medal of Freedom.
Since 1992, the Pittsburgh Penguins have awarded the Edward J. Debartolo Community Service Award to "The players who have donated a considerable amount of time during the season to working on community and charity projects."
In 1996, he was inducted posthumously into the Pittsburgh Penguins Hall of Fame.

References

1909 births
1994 deaths
20th-century American businesspeople
American businesspeople in retailing
Eclipse Award winners
National Hockey League executives
National Hockey League owners
Pittsburgh Penguins owners
Presidential Medal of Freedom recipients
San Francisco 49ers owners
Stanley Cup champions
University of Notre Dame alumni
United States Football League executives
Businesspeople from Youngstown, Ohio
American people of Italian descent
DeBartolo family